Liolaemus cinereus is a species of lizard in the family  Liolaemidae. It is native to Argentina.

References

cinereus
Reptiles described in 2006
Reptiles of Argentina